Faun Fables is an American band based in Oakland, California. Faun Fables is a concept and vehicle for Dawn McCarthy, who was inspired to write the original material while traveling after leaving the New York City music scene in 1997. Faun Fables also covers 20th century compositions by other songwriters and traditional folk songs. The music on the first album is entirely by McCarthy, as are all lyrics and most of the music on Mother Twilight. All albums except for the first are collaborations with Nils Frykdahl, inspired by McCarthy's previous work and "Dawn the Faun" stage persona.

Collaborations
Main collaborator Nils Frykdahl is known for his work with Sleepytime Gorilla Museum and Idiot Flesh. 
Faun Fables albums and shows also feature collaborations with:
 Family members - sister Sheila Bosco (Autobody; Drumhead; Flaming Fire; zBug), brother Brian McCarthy, and mother Michelina Tyrie;
 Matt Waldron of 'irr. app. (ext.)'
 Robin Coomer of 'Loop!Station'
 Kirana Peyton of Blackbird Stitches;
 Isabel Douglass of Rupa & the April Fishes;
 Noe Venable;
 Will Oldham;
 Dan Rathbun of Sleepytime Gorilla Museum (bass guitar)

Performance
McCarthy's performances draw on many influences, including British, Scandinavian, Appalachian and Eastern European music. Her shows often contain elements of theater—dance and puppet shows are common elements. She has covered songs of Ewa Demarczyk and Brigitte Fontaine, and her music has been compared to neo-psych-folk artists such as Devendra Banhart and Current 93.

The Transit Rider
This is an ambitious performance and multimedia documentation of a song cycle entitled The Transit Rider.

Discography

Members

Current
 Dawn McCarthy: composer, vocals, guitars, percussion, stomping, autoharp, gamelan
 Nils Frykdahl: composer, guitars, flutes, vocals, percussion, autoharp, broom

Former
 Sheila Bosco: vocals, percussion
 Kirana Peyton: bass, vocals, percussion, harmonium
 Meredith Yayanos: violin, theremin, vocals, percussion
The Transit Rider North America Tour 2006:
 Jenya Chernoff: drums, bass guitar, vocals
 Matt Lebofsky: guitar, bass guitar, warr guitar, vocals

References

External links
 Official Faun Fables web site

Drag City (record label) artists
Musical groups established in 1999
Musical groups from Oakland, California
Psychedelic folk groups
Freak folk
1999 establishments in California